Jonas Pangonis (born 26 November 1950) is a Lithuanian politician.  In 1990 he was among those who signed the Act of the Re-Establishment of the State of Lithuania.

References

1950 births
Living people
Members of the Seimas
Social Democratic Party of Lithuania politicians
Place of birth missing (living people)